Bol is a surname in the Low Countries and in South Sudan.

Dutch surname
"Bol" and "Bols" are Dutch surnames with a variety of origins. These can be patronymic (after Bolle/Bole short forms of the Germanic personal name Baldo), occupational (bol = bread roll, referring to a baker), and descriptive (someone with a bol hoofd =round/bald head). People with this surname include:

Bol
 Cees Bol (born 1995), Dutch cyclist
 Cornelis Bol/Boel (c. 1575 – after 1621), Flemish draughtsman and engraver
 Cornelis Bol (1589–1666), Flemish painter
 Femke Bol (born 2000),  Dutch track and field athlete
 Ferdinand Bol (1616–1680), Dutch painter, etcher, and draftsman
 Gerrit Bol (1906–1989), Dutch mathematician
 Hans Bol (1534–1593), Flemish painter in the Northern Mannerist style
 Henri Bol (1945–2000), Dutch still life painter 
 Jan Bol (born 1924), Dutch Olympic sailor
 Jetse Bol (born 1989), Dutch road bicycle racer
 Kees Bol (1916–2009), Dutch painter and art educator
 Laurens J. Bol (1898–1994), Dutch art historian specialized in 17th-century painters 
 Peter Bol (historian) (born 1948), historian and sinologist
 Todd Bol (1956–2018), American public bookcase maker

 Eric Bols (1904–1985), British Army officer of Belgian descent
 Jan Bols (born 1944), Dutch speed skater
 Lou Bols (1905–1957), Australian rules footballer
 Louis Bols (1867–1930), South African military officer in the British Army
 Lucas Bols (1652-1719), Dutch distiller
 Mikael Bols (born 1961), Danish organic chemist

South Sudanese surname
Abraham Makoi Bol, governor of Western Lakes State, South Sudan
Bol Bol (born 1999), Sudanese-born American basketball player; son of Manute Bol
Francis Piol Bol Bok (born 1979), Dinka tribesman, abolitionist and author living in the United States
Grace Bol (born 1990),  South Sudanese fashion model
Kerubino Kuanyin Bol (1948-1999), a leader of the Sudan People's Liberation Army
Manute Bol (1962–2010), Sudanese-born American basketball player and political activist
Peter Bol (runner) (born 1994), Australian middle-distance runner
Peter Bol Koang, governor of Eastern Bieh, South Sudan
Samuel Aru Bol (1929–2000), prominent politician who signed the Khartoum Peace Agreement of 1997

See also
Boll (surname)
Bowles (surname)

Dutch-language surnames